Caroline Pleidrup Gram (born 11 December 2000) is a Danish professional footballer who plays as a centre back for Italian Serie A club US Sassuolo and has appeared for the Denmark women's national under-23 team. She has also played for the Danish youth teams, several times.

She has played for Brøndby IF's first team, since December 2017.

Honours

Club
Brøndby IF
 Elitedivisionen
 Winner: 2019
 Runners-up: 2018
 Danish Cup
 Winner: 2018
 Runners-up: 2019

FOOTBALL CAREER TRANSFERS AND STATISTICS 
We are going to show you the list of football clubs and seasons in which Caroline Pleidrup Gram has played. It includes the total number of appearance (caps), substitution details, goals, yellow and red cards stats.

References

External links
 
 
Profile at Danish Football Association 

2000 births
Living people
Danish women's footballers
Denmark women's international footballers
Brøndby IF (women) players
Women's association football midfielders
People from Brøndby Municipality
Sportspeople from the Capital Region of Denmark